Ultraísta is the eponymous debut studio album by British experimental rock band Ultraísta. It was released 2 October 2012 under Temporary Residence Limited.

The first single, "Smalltalk", was released 9 May 2012. Following the release of the album, touring from the band was cut short after drummer Joey Waronker had his first child. This same touring issue would occur when the promotion for the band's sophomore album would be affected by the COVID-19 pandemic.

On 22 November 2019, a deluxe version of the album was released. It includes all the remixes of songs from the album that had been released in 2013, featuring remixes from Zero 7, David Lynch, CHVRCHES, Four Tet, among others.

Critical reception
Ultraísta was met with generally favourable reviews from critics. At Metacritic, which assigns a weighted average rating out of 100 to reviews from mainstream publications, this release received an average score of 64, based on 16 reviews

Accolades

Track listing
All tracks written by Ultraísta.

Personnel 

 Laura Bettinson - vocals, synthesizer, songwriting
 Nigel Godrich - production, bass guitar, synthesizer, songwriting
 Joey Waronker - drums, percussion, songwriting

References

2012 debut albums
Temporary Residence Limited albums
Ultraísta albums